Bréhier, anglicised Brehier, is a French surname. Notable people with the surname include:

 Émile Bréhier (1876–1952), French philosopher
 Louis Bréhier (1868–1951), French historian, brother of Émile

See also
 Breier

French-language surnames